Demir Demirkan (born 12 August 1972) is a Turkish musician, Eurovision Song Contest winning composer, formerly guitarist for thrash metal band Mezarkabul. Demir Demirkan started playing music when he was 13 and played guitar with various groups in college. Demir Demirkan also wrote television jingles and composed soundtracks for television and films.

Early life and influences
Demirkan started playing music when he was 13 and played guitar with various groups in college.  In 1990, Demir joined a heavy/rock group, Mezarkabul, based in Istanbul and wrote and played guitar in the group's second album, Trail Blazer.

In 1992, he moved to Los Angeles where he studied with Scott Henderson, Frank Gambale and Paul Hanson who founded the MI-Musician's Institute.

In 1996, he moved back to Istanbul and worked as a producer, guitarist and composer for various artists such as Sebnem Ferah and Sertab Erener. Demir rejoined Mezarkabul again in 1997 and recorded the Anatolia album.

Career
Demirkan played his first guitar at age 13, and attained national stardom in 1990 when he joined the Istanbul heavy rock group Mezarkabul as songwriter and guitarist. In 1992, he studied at Musician's Institute in Los Angeles with Scott Henderson, Frank Gambale, and MI founder Paul Hanson, also playing studio and live gigs.

In 2000, Demir released his eponymous initial solo album with Sony Music. His albums Dunya Benim (The World is Mine) and 2004 Istanbul followed in 2002 and 2004. The latter sold in 11 European countries after his successful tour with Mike Tramp (Whitelion).

The songs Demir wrote for Sertab Erener were widely accepted in Europe and Turkey. One of these songs, “Every Way That I Can,” won the first prize in the 2003 Eurovision Song Competition and sold 400,000 units worldwide.

Demirkan also wrote television jingles and composed soundtracks for television and films. One of the more remarkable works of Demirkan was the music he composed for the documentary about Gallipoli/Gelibolu in 2005. That soundtrack involved ethnical strings recorded in Turkey and classical melodies recorded by a symphonic orchestra and choir in the Czech Republic. It was released in Turkey and Australia.

Demirkan and Sertab Erener embarked on the international project Painted on Water together. This innovative work entitled Ebru was co-produced by Demir and Jay Newland, a multi- Grammy-winning-producer (Norah Jones’ “Come Away with Me”), and released on Motéma Music.

His Los Angeles experience informed the current project in several ways, not least the fact that "the L.A. vibe is great for art," Demirkan says. "Every day when I was studying in Hollywood, I passed A&M Studios, and I wanted to record an album there. When we were ready to record Painted on Water, we had to search for them because they'd changed to their name to Hanson. Every time I passed by, I promised myself I’d get there and record, so it was a great moment, a dream came true."

Demirkan continues his solo career in Turkey.

Albums 
Demir Demirkan (2000)
Dünya Benim (2002)
2004 İstanbul (2004)
Gelibolu (OST) (2005)
Ateş Yağmurunda Çırılçıplak (2007)
Yolun Yarısı (2008)
Painted on Water (with Sertab Erener) (2010)
Biriz (2011)
2000-2012 (2012)
Tam Ölmek de Değil (2014)
Elysium on Ashes (2019)

References

 https://www.dailysabah.com/arts/portrait/sertab-erener-turkish-winner-of-eurovision-song-contest

External links
 

1972 births
Living people
People from Adana
Turkish rock singers
Turkish songwriters
Turkish heavy metal guitarists
Musicians Institute alumni
Eurovision Song Contest winners
21st-century Turkish singers
21st-century guitarists
21st-century Turkish male singers